The Academia de la Llingua Asturiana or Academy of the Asturian Language (ALLA) is an Official Institution of the Government of the Principality of Asturias that promotes and regulates the Asturian language, a language of the Spanish autonomous community of Asturias. Among its principal objectives are investigating and normalising the Asturian Language, developing a dictionary, promoting its use and education and awarding literary prizes. It has 21 full members, 19 foreign members and 15 honorary members, and its current (as of 2006) president is Ana María Cano González.

History

ALLA first notice appears in the 18th century, when Gaspar Melchor de Jovellanos and Carlos González de Posada talk in their letters about the idea of creating it in 1791. Jovellanos' project, however, was aborted because of his imprisonment in Majorca.

In 1920s the Real Academia Asturiana de las Artes y las Letras (Royal Academy of Asturian Arts and Letters) was created by some intellectuals, including José Antonio García Peláez (Pin de Pría). It was divided in four sections and its principal objectives were to create an Asturian dictionary and grammar and to publish a magazine. Other sections were dedicated to promoting Asturian literature, theatre and music.

But it was from 1980 when the Asturian pre-autonomous government, the Consejo Regional, approved the creation of the ALLA, founded 15 December of the same year. Xosé Lluis García Arias was its first president from that moment until 2001 when Ana Cano took over from him.

Works
In 1981 the Normes Ortográfiques y Conxugación de Verbos (Orthographic Norms and Verb Conjugation), the first academic work, was published. Other publications followed, such as the Gramática de la Llingua Asturiana (Asturian Language Grammar) in 1998 and the Diccionariu de la Llingua Asturiana (Asturian Language Dictionary) in 2000, also known as «DALLA».

The ALLA also publish: 
 a bulletin featuring literary and linguistic studies about the Asturian language, called Lletres Asturianes (Asturian Letters)  , 
 and another one with anthropological studies about Asturias: Cultures. 
It also works as an editorial house, with book collections, such as: 
 Escolín (Student, children literature), 
 Llibrería facsimilar (Facsimile library), 
 Cartafueyos de lliteratura escaecida (Notes on forgotten literature, ancient works in Asturian Language), 
 Llibrería llingüística (Linguistic Library, linguistic studies) , 
 or Llibrería académica (Academical library, literature).

It also organised every year the Dia de les lletres asturianes (Day of Asturian Letters) since 1982, on the first Friday of May.

List of members
As of 2008, this is the complete list of members of the Academy of Asturian Language

Full members
 Genaro Alonso Megido
 Lluis Xabel Álvarez Fernández
 Ramón d'Andrés Díaz
 Emilio Barriuso Fernández
 Xosé Bolado García
 Ana María Cano González
 Javier Fernández Conde
 Xosé Lluis García Arias
 Vicente García Oliva
 Manuel Asur González García
 Xosé Antón González Riaño
 Roberto González-Quevedo González
 Xosé Ramón Iglesias Cueva
 Carlos Lastra López
 Francisco José Llera Ramo
 Pablo Xuan Manzano Rodríguez
 Josefina Martínez Álvarez
 Miguel Ramos Corrada
 Urbano Rodríguez Vázquez
 Carlos Rubiera Tuya
 Xuan Xosé Sánchez Vicente
 Isabel Torrente Fernández
 Mª Josefa Canellada Llavona (†)
 Lorenzo Novo Mier (†)

Foreign members
 Lourdes Álvarez García
 Xuan Bello Fernán
 Xurde Blanco Puente
 Adolfo Camilo Díaz López
 José Antonio Fernández Vior
 Félix Ferreiro Currás
 Xosé Ignaciu Fonseca Alonso
 Ernesto García del Castillo
 Corsino García Gutiérrez
 Mª Esther García López
 Xulio Llaneza Fernández
 Alfonso Martín Caso
 Próspero Morán López
 Marta Mori de Arriba
 Felipe Prieto García
 David M. Rivas Infante
 Vicente Rodríguez Hevia
 Miguel Solís Santos
 Juan Carlos Villaverde Amieva
 Xosé Álvarez Fernández (†)
 Manuel d'Andrés Fernández (†)
 Andrés Solar Santurio (†)

Honorary members
 José Aurelio Álvarez Fernández
 The President of the Coleutivu Manuel Fernández de Castro
 The President of Euskaltzaindia
 James W. Fernández McClintock
 Xulián Fernández Montes
 Raimundo Fernández Rodríguez
 Manuel García-Galano
 Michael Metzeltin
 The President of the Institut d'Estudis Catalans
 Jesús Landeira
 Júlio Meirinhos
 Celso Muñiz
 The President of the Real Academia Española
 The President of the Real Academia Galega
 Emilio Alarcos Llorach (†)
 Álvaro Galmés de Fuentes (†)
 Joaquín Manzanares Rodríguez-Mir (†)
 José Luis Pensado Tomé (†)
 Alonso Zamora Vicente (†)

Reference publications
 Academia de la Llingua Asturiana (1993). Normes Ortográfiques y Conxugación de Verbos (4th ed.) . ALLA  
 Academia de la Llingua Asturiana (1999). Gramática de la Llingua Asturiana (2nd ed.). ALLA 
 Academia de la Llingua Asturiana (2000). Diccionariu de la llingua asturiana. ALLA

Notes

External links
Official site (in Asturian)

Language regulators
Asturian language
1980 establishments in Spain
Organizations established in 1980